Lešane (in older sources Lešena) is a village in the Municipality of Apače in northeastern Slovenia.

References

External links 
Lešane on Geopedia

Populated places in the Municipality of Apače